Bloody Valentine may refer to:

 "Bloody Valentine" (song), a song by Machine Gun Kelly from the 2020 album Tickets to My Downfall
 "Bloody Valentine", a song by Kim Petras from the 2019 album Turn Off the Light
 Bloody Valentine tragedy, a fictional event in the anime Mobile Suit Gundam SEED
 Bloody Valentine, a 2010 novella in the Blue Bloods by Melissa de la Cruz

See also
 My Bloody Valentine (disambiguation)